Ozawa Dam is an earthfill dam located in Chiba Prefecture in Japan. The dam is used for irrigation. The catchment area of the dam is 0.7 km2. The dam impounds about 5  ha of land when full and can store 335 thousand cubic meters of water. The construction of the dam was started on 1989 and completed in 1992.

References

Dams in Chiba Prefecture
1992 establishments in Japan